Samra Habib is a Pakistani Canadian photographer, writer and activist. They are most noted for Just Me and Allah, a photography project they launched in 2014 to document the lives of LGBTQ Muslims, and We Have Always Been Here, a memoir of their experience as a queer-identified Muslim published in 2019 by Penguin Random House Canada.

Born in Pakistan to Ahmadi Muslim parents, Habib emigrated to Canada with their family in 1991 to escape religious persecution. They grew up primarily in Toronto and were forced into an arranged marriage as a teenager before coming out as queer.

We Have Always Been Here was the winner of the 2020 edition of Canada Reads, in which it was defended by actress Amanda Brugel. It was also longlisted for the RBC Taylor Prize, and won a Lambda Literary Award for Lesbian Memoir or Biography at the 32nd Lambda Literary Awards.

References

21st-century Canadian photographers
21st-century Canadian non-fiction writers
21st-century Canadian women writers
Canadian women photographers
Pakistani emigrants to Canada
Canadian Muslims
Canadian memoirists
Canadian LGBT artists
Canadian LGBT writers
LGBT Muslims
Queer artists
LGBT photographers
Queer writers
Pakistani LGBT people
Muslim artists
Muslim writers
Living people
Year of birth missing (living people)
21st-century women photographers
21st-century memoirists
Lambda Literary Award winners
Canadian women memoirists
Canadian Ahmadis
21st-century Canadian LGBT people